Rolfsån is a river in Sweden, the main outflow of lake Lygnern. It empties out into the Kungsbacka Fjord.

References

Rivers of Halland County